Nancy Sinatra is a studio album by Nancy Sinatra, released on Attack Records in 2004. It peaked at number 94 on the UK Albums Chart.

Critical reception

At Metacritic, which assigns a weighted average score out of 100 to reviews from mainstream critics, the album received an average score of 68, based on 16 reviews, indicating "generally favorable reviews".

David Peschek of The Guardian gave the album 4 stars out of 5, calling it "a late-period album that actually stands up with the best of a much-loved artist's work."

Track listing

Personnel
Credits adapted from liner notes.

 Nancy Sinatra – vocals
 Morrissey – backing vocals
 Linda Fabio – backing vocals
 Pat Erickson – backing vocals
 Don Randi – piano
 Paul Niehaus – pedal steel guitar
 Joey Burns – guitar, string arrangement
 Johnny Reno – guitar, bass guitar, drum programming
 Richard Hawley – guitar, harmonica, lyre, vibraphone
 Jon Spencer – guitar, vocals
 Alain Whyte – guitar, backing vocals
 Boz Boorer – guitar
 Lanny Cordola – guitar
 Thurston Moore – guitar
 Randy Strom – guitar
 John DePatie – guitar
 Pete Yorn – bass guitar, harmonica, backing vocals
 Tom Lilly – bass guitar, keyboards, backing vocals
 Jim O'Rourke – bass guitar, percussion, piano
 Adam Clayton – bass guitar
 Gary Day – bass guitar
 Volker Zander – bass guitar
 Matt Azzarto – bass guitar
 Frank Fabio – bass guitar
 Sam Bardfeld – violin, string arrangement
 Christian Howes – violin
 Leah Coloff – cello
 Buford O'Sullivan – trombone
 Jacob Valenzuela – trumpet
 Martin Wenk – trumpet
 Dennis Diken – drums, percussion
 Larry Mullen Jr. – drums
 Pete Thomas – drums
 Miles Robinson – drums
 John Convertino – drums
 Fran Azzarto – drums
 Dean Butterworth – drums
 Jarvis Cocker – percussion
 Claudia Chopek – percussion
 A.J. Azzarto – percussion

Charts

References

External links
 
 

2004 albums
Nancy Sinatra albums
Sanctuary Records albums